= Avdiyes =

Russian masculine given name

Avdiyes (Russian: Авдие́с) is an old and uncommon Russian Christian male first name. Its form Avdiisus (Авдиису́с) was included into various, often handwritten, church calendars throughout the 17th–19th centuries, but was omitted from the official Synodal Menologium at the end of the 19th century.

It is possibly derived from the Latin word audio, meaning to listen, or from the Biblical Hebrew abdiyës̄, meaning a servant (slave) of Jesus.

The patronymics derived from "Avdiyes" are "Авдие́сович" (Avdiyesovich; masculine) and "Авдие́совна" (Avdiyesovna; feminine).
